Thrashin' (released in the Philippines as Challenge to Win: Thrashin') is a 1986 American skater drama film directed by David Winters and starring Josh Brolin, Robert Rusler, and Pamela Gidley.

The film features appearances from many famous skaters such as Tony Alva, Tony Hawk, Christian Hosoi and Steve Caballero. The film also stars Sherilyn Fenn, who was cast by the director, together with her boyfriend at the time Johnny Depp, who was later rejected by the producer. The Red Hot Chili Peppers make an appearance in the film as well. The film is considered to be a cult classic.

Plot 
Corey Webster is an amateur skateboarder from out of town staying in Los Angeles with friends in hopes of competing and winning a downhill competition for which he has been training. During his stay in LA, he falls for a beautiful blonde named Chrissy, who just happens to be the younger sister of Hook, the leader of "The Daggers", a tough punk rock skateboard gang in the Los Angeles/Venice Beach areas. Chrissy is not a Dagger herself but has come from her home in Indiana to stay with her brother in L.A. for the summer.

Corey and his crew "The Ramp Locals" often have confrontations throughout the film because of Corey's disobedience to Hook when asked not to come around or call Chrissy again. Chrissy, however, can choose her own relationships and has the opposite interest. Corey disobeys and is chased on skateboard through city streets and a parking garage by The Daggers. He barely escapes by boarding a bus and exiting through the back door and onto the roof while the rival gang members search the cabin of the bus. Through all of that memorable scene, the Circle Jerks song "Wild in the Streets" is played, showcasing the connection between '80s hardcore punk rock and skateboarding culture (Vice Squad, Devo, SST Records and Siouxsie and the Banshees T-shirts can be seen on skateboarders throughout the film as well).  Upset at Corey, The Daggers find The Ramp Locals' half-pipe and burn it to the ground, thus creating more drama between the two skate crews.

Corey and Hook later meet up that night, after an earlier confrontation, at the "Dagger house" (a punk rock house overrun with Daggers and graffiti, quite common in the 1980s throughout Los Angeles communities). The rivals joust in the Bronson Canyon ditch until Corey is injured and the police arrive. With Corey's arm broken he is convinced he cannot compete in the downhill, and places blame on Chrissy, who wasn't there to assist him in his time of need; she left with the Daggers as the police were arriving, but in protest reminds him that she had begged him not to engage in the duel in the first place. As Chrissy is driving away, Corey runs outside to try to make up with her, but she doesn't hear him behind her. An emotionally upset Chrissy arrives back at the Daggers' house, tells her brother she is going back to Indiana, and asks to be driven to the bus station in the morning; she goes upstairs to pack. Later, Corey skates over to the Daggers' house looking for Chrissy, but Hook's girlfriend tells him that she has already taken Chrissy to the bus station, that she doesn't have a phone number for Chrissy, and that Chrissy was crying inconsolably when she returned.  These are all lies; Chrissy is still upstairs packing. Later that night, Chrissy and her brother have a heart to heart about his protectiveness of her as he drives her to the bus station, where she gets on the bus to Indiana.

Meanwhile, Corey mopes around. He starts to miss Chrissy and begins to practice downhill skateboarding. With a broken arm he has to be very cautious and proves to not be able to perform as well. Chrissy, having second thoughts, exits her bus on the highway and hitch-hikes back to Los Angeles just in time to see Corey and Hook battle it out in the last turn of the downhill race. Hook flies over the side of the road and Corey speeds through the finish line at 63 mph off a ramp and into a crowd of fans who cheer him in victory. He is awarded a professional contract with Smash Skates and enough money to rebuild the destroyed ramp burnt by the Daggers. Hook tells Corey that he respects his skill and approves Corey's relationship with Chrissy, seeing Corey as worthy and respectful, and apparently having taken his talk with Chrissy to heart. In respecting Corey, Hook, for the first time, is looked at as respectable as well.

Cast 
 Josh Brolin as Corey Webster
 Robert Rusler as Tommy Hook
 Pamela Gidley as Chrissy
 Chuck McCann as Sam Flood
 Brooke McCarter as Tyler
 Josh Richman as Radley
 Brett Marx as 'Bozo'
 David Wagner as 'Little Stevie'
 Tony Alva as 'T.A.'
 Mark Munski as Monk
 Sherilyn Fenn as 'Velvet'
 Rocky Giordani as Skate Club Bouncer
 Steve Whittaker as Bus Driver
 Per Welinder as himself
 Red Hot Chili Peppers as themselves

Production 
Director David Winters, upset after being overruled on a casting decision for Thrashin, made the professional decision to control all aspects of future projects he worked on. Winters' first choice was a pre-21 Jump Street Johnny Depp who was cast in the film together with Depp's girlfriend at the time, Sherilyn Fenn, but after three attempts to get Depp approved by the producer, Winters had no choice but to recast, ultimately casting Robert Rusler. Brolin was first offered, and turned down, the role of Tom Hansen on 21 Jump Street – which ultimately went to Depp.

Winters himself had been in the original cast of West Side Story (on Broadway) as well as appearing in the film, certainly making him an appropriate choice to direct, given the resemblance between that classic "competing gangs" story – inspired by Shakespeare's Montagues and Capulets – and the plot of this film.

Release 
Thrashin was released in the United States on August 29, 1986. In the Philippines, the film was released as Challenge to Win: Thrashin''' by Bell Films on October 9, 1987.

 Reception 
Sixteen years after the initial film release, the MTV series Jackass, in a February 2002 episode, played homage to the "jousting scene" with "maces and man-purse".

The Board Sport industry continues to describe this film as "legendary".

 Soundtrack 
The film features a performance from the Freaky Styley'' incarnation of the Red Hot Chili Peppers, with Cliff Martinez and Hillel Slovak, as well as music by Devo, Circle Jerks and Meat Loaf. Some of the bands featured in the film went on to have number one records.

References

External links 
 
 
 Daggers!!!

1986 films
1980s teen drama films
1986 drama films
American teen drama films
Films set in Los Angeles
Films shot in Los Angeles
Punk films
Skateboarding films
Films scored by Barry Goldberg
1980s English-language films
Films directed by David Winters
1980s American films